Keith Zizza is a video game soundtrack composer. He has worked as a composer and audio director for companies such as Electronic Arts, Impressions Games, Sierra Entertainment and Tilted Mill Entertainment. His discography includes more than 25 AAA game titles. In April 2008 Zizza released his debut solo album, Memories of a Forgotten Age.

Discography

Video games 

 Lords of the Realm II (1996)
 Grant, Lee, Sherman: Civil War Generals 2 (1997)
 Lords of Magic (1997)
 Pharaoh (1999)
 Zeus: Master of Olympus (2000)
 Immortal Cities: Children of the Nile (2004)
 Caesar IV (2006)
 SimCity Societies (2007)

Solo works 

 Memories of a Forgotten Age (2008)

External links 
 
 
 Composer profile at OverClocked ReMix
 Composer profile at MobyGames
 Composer profile at Gamasutra

References 

21st-century American composers
American male composers
Living people
Video game composers
21st-century American male musicians
Year of birth missing (living people)